Lambertia inermis, Noongar chittick, is a shrub which is endemic to south-west Western Australia. It grows to 6 metres high and flowers from spring to winter. A more complete description is given in Florabase and Australian Flora online.

There are two varieties:
Lambertia inermis var. drummondii (Fielding & Gardner) Hnatiuk - with yellow flowers
Lambertia inermis R.Br. var. inermis - with orange-red flowers

Distribution and habitat
Chittick grows near the south coast of Western Australia from west of Albany through to around Esperance, extending between 50 and 200 km inland from the coast. It grows on a variety of soils from sand to gravel.

References

External links
Lambertia inermis occurrence data from Australasian Virtual Herbarium
Herbarium specimen at Royal Botanic Gardens Kew

inermis
Eudicots of Western Australia
Plants described in 1810
Endemic flora of Southwest Australia